Jahana (Kanji: 謝花) is a Ryukyuan surname. Notable people with the surname include:

 Kiichiro Jahana (謝花 喜一郎), vice governor of Okinawa Prefecture
 Noboru Jahana (謝花 昇), Okinawan rights activist and politician

See also 

 Okinawan name

Okinawan surnames
Japanese-language surnames